Ovenden's Mill or Mockett's Mill is a grade II* listed tower mill at Polegate, East Sussex, England which has been restored and is open to the public.

History

Ovenden's Mill was built in 1817 and was working by wind until 1943. The mill was worked by auxiliary engine, latterly an electric motor, until 1965. By the time the mill stopped working, it was becoming derelict. Eastbourne and District Preservation Trust bought the mill and grounds, and a restoration was carried out by E Hole and Sons, the Burgess Hill millwrights. One of the new stocks broke in July 1974, bringing the sail with it. This particular stock was only seven years old. Thompson's, the Alford millwrights fitted a replacement stock and two new sails in May 1976. Further restoration work was undertaken in 2004, including the fitting of a cowl to the adjoining malthouse. Two new sails were fitted in 2009.

Description

Ovenden's Mill is a four-storey brick tower mill with a domed cap winded by a fantail. There is a stage at first floor level. It had four Patent sails carried on a cast iron Windshaft. The Brake Wheel is wooden. The mill drove two pairs of overdrift millstones, with a third pair driven underdrift by auxiliary engine.

Millers

Joseph Seymour 1817–1857
Mathias Mockett 1857–
George Thomas
Ephraim Ovenden 1918–
Albert Ovenden – 1965

References for above:-

Further reading
 Online version

References

External links
Windmill World Page on Polegate windmill.

Tower mills in the United Kingdom
Grinding mills in the United Kingdom
Museums in East Sussex
Windmills completed in 1817
Grade II* listed buildings in East Sussex
Windmills in East Sussex
Mill museums in England
1817 establishments in England